Shahid Navvab-e Safavi Metro Station is a station in Tehran Metro Line 2 and Line 7. It is located in  the junction of Navvab Expressway and Azarbayjan Street. It is between Hor Square Metro Station and Shademan Metro Station (Formerly known as Azadi Station). It is named after Navvab Safavi. The station also serve Line 7.

References

Tehran Metro stations